
Year 842 (DCCCXLII) was a common year starting on Sunday (link will display the full calendar) of the Julian calendar.

Events 
 By place 
 Byzantine Empire 
 January 20 – Emperor Theophilos dies of dysentery at Constantinople, after a 12-year reign in which he expended much effort defending the eastern frontier against the invading Muslim Arabs. Theophilos is succeeded by his 2-year-old son Michael III, with his mother Theodora as regent and the 'temporary' sole ruler of the Byzantine Empire.
 February 19 – The Medieval Iconoclastic Controversy ends as a council in Constantinople formally reinstates the veneration of icons in the churches.

 Europe 
 February 14 – Oaths of Strasbourg: King Louis the German, ruler of East Francia, and his half-brother Charles the Bald, ruler of West Francia, meet with their armies at Strasbourg. They agree to swear allegiance (recorded in vernacular languages) to each other, and to support each other against their brother Lothair I (nominal emperor of all the Frankish kingdoms and the Holy Roman Empire).
 March 20 – King Alfonso II of Asturias (Northern Spain) dies after a 50-year reign, in which he undertook numerous campaigns against the Muslim armies of the Umayyad Emirate of Córdoba, and allied himself with the late Charlemagne. The childless Alfonso chooses Ramiro I, son of former king Bermudo I, as his successor.

 Britain 
 Uurad of the Picts dies after a 3-year reign, and is succeeded by his son Bridei VI, who contests his power with rival groups, led by Bruide son of Fokel and Kenneth MacAlpin.
 Vikings attack the Irish monastery at Clonmacnoise from bases in Ireland.

 Abbasid Caliphate 

 January 5 – Caliph Al-Mu'tasim dies at Samarra (modern Iraq), after an eight year reign. He is succeeded by his son Al-Wathiq, as ruler of the Abbasid Caliphate.
 Abbasid caliph Al-Wathiq appointed his brother, Jaʽfar ibn Muhammad al-Mutasim (future al-Mutawakkil) as Leader of Hajj in 842.

Births 
 Al-Mundhir, Muslim emir (approximate date)
 Al-Muwaffaq, Muslim prince and regent (d. 891)
 Li Hanzhi, Chinese warlord (d. 899)
 Pietro I Candiano, doge of Venice (approximate date)
 Yang Fuguang, Chinese general (d. 883)

Deaths 
 January 5 – Al-Mu'tasim, Muslim caliph (b. 796)
 January 20 – Theophilus, Byzantine emperor (b. 813)
 March 9 – Humbert, bishop of Würzburg
 March 16 – Xiao Mian, chancellor of the Tang Dynasty
 August 16 – Death of Qaratis also known as Umm Harun, was the mother of Abbasid caliph al-Wathiq (r. 842–847). She died during her Hajj pilgrimage journey.
 August 24 – Saga, emperor of Japan (b. 786)
 October 22 – Abo, Japanese prince (b. 792)
 Alfonso II, king of Asturias (b. 759)
 Bernard of Vienne, Frankish bishop (b. 778)
 Dúngal mac Fergaile, king of Osraige (Ireland)
 Li Cheng, chancellor of the Tang Dynasty
 Liu Yuxi, Chinese poet and philosopher (b. 772)
 Sugawara no Kiyotomo, Japanese nobleman (b. 770)
 Uurad, king of the Picts (approximate date)
 We Gyaltore Taknye, Tibetan nobleman
 Zheng Tan, chancellor of the Tang Dynasty

References